Maddalena de' Medici (25 July 1473–2 December 1528) daughter to Lorenzo de' Medici 
Born in Florence, she was educated with her siblings to the humanistic cultures by figures such as Angelo Poliziano.  In February 1487 she was engaged to be married to Franceschetto Cybo, son of Pope Innocent VIII.  They were married in January 1488, and she brought a dowry of 4000 ducats.  This marriage brought closer connections for her family and the Vatican, helping her brother Giovanni get appointed as a cardinal.  She used her influence with her father, her brother Piero, and the pope to help friends and poorer people get aid and positions within the church and governments.

In 1488 she bought a thermal bath resort in Stigliano.  She had it renovated into a profitable resort.

Maddalena lived in Rome after the election of her brother Giovanni as Pope Leo X in 1513.  Shortly after his election, Pope Leo made her son Innocenzo a Cardinal.  Maddalena received Roman citizenship and a pension from her brother in 1515.  She worked to get all of her children married to noble families.  She continued in her role of patron, negotiating with Pope Leo and her nephew, Lorenzo to get clients protection, funds, and release from prison and exile.  She died in Rome, and was buried in St. Peter's Basilica by order of her cousin, Pope Clement VII.

Issue
Franceschetto and Maddalena had eight children:
Lucrezia Cybo (1489–1492) 
Clarice Cybo (1490–1492) born deformed, died as a child
Innocenzo Cybo (1491–1550), Cardinal
Eleonora Cybo (1499 - 1557), Benedictine nun
Lorenzo Cybo (1500–1549) Duke of Ferentillo, married Ricciarda Malaspina and founded the Cybo Malaspina family
Caterina Cybo (1501–1557), married Giovanni Maria da Varano, Duke of Camerino
Ippolita Cybo (1503–1503) 
Giovanni Battista Cybo (1505–1550)

Ancestry

References

Sources

1473 births
1528 deaths
15th-century Italian women
Maddalena di Lorenzo
Cybo family
Nobility from Florence
16th-century Italian women